Todorin Dimitrov (born 28 August 1986) is a football midfielder from Silistra, Bulgaria.

References

 

1986 births
Living people
Bulgarian footballers
PFC Chernomorets Burgas players
FC Pomorie players
FC Etar 1924 Veliko Tarnovo players
First Professional Football League (Bulgaria) players
Association football midfielders